21 Nights with Pattie (original title: 21 nuits avec Pattie) is a 2015 French comedy-drama film written and directed by Arnaud and Jean-Marie Larrieu.

Plot
A forty-two-year-old Parisian named Caroline comes to a small village in Southern France because she has to organise the funeral of her mother. Caroline, who didn't get along all too well with her deceased mother, finds a new friend in a local woman named Pattie who introduces her to local gossip. While the traditional mid-summer dance is about to take place, the corpse disappears.

Cast 
 Isabelle Carré as Caroline
 Karin Viard as Pattie
 André Dussollier as Jean 
 Sergi López as Manuel 
  as Pierre 
 Denis Lavant as André
 Philippe Rebbot as Jean-Marc
 Jules Ritmanic as Kamil
 Mathilde Monnier as Isabelle

Accolades

References

External links 
 

2015 films
2015 comedy-drama films
2010s French-language films
French comedy-drama films
Films directed by Arnaud Larrieu
Films directed by Jean-Marie Larrieu
2010s French films